The Company of Cacheu and Rivers and Commerce of Guinea (Portuguese: Companhia de Cacheu, rios e comércio da Guiné) was a Portuguese colonial company. It succeeded the Guinea Coast Company and was intended to promote trade in manufactured fabrics, ivory, and slaves in the Guinea region of West Africa.

History 
Plans for Portugal to set up a new monopolized company has been proposed by Manuel de Costa Pessoa for as early as 1671. With this in account, the Portuguese monarchy established the Company of Cacheu and Rivers and Commerce of Guinea after several discussions in 1675. Its privileges were confirmed on May 19, 1676 by Prince Regent Peter II, namely the right to trade slaves and other products off the coast of Guinea and the Cape Verde islands, as well as exporting said products to the Americas. However, 1/3rd of the company's ships were reserved for Cape Verde residents who could have their own products shipped within the scope of a guaranteed right to free trade in the area. The Cape Verde residents had a large degree of autonomy, with the only exception of being prohibited to deal with foreigners. Such amends to the company's regulations were mainly the doing of Cape Verde governor at the time, João Cardoso Pissaro. The company ceased its activities in 1682, being succeeded by the Company of Cacheu and Cape Verde from 1690 onwards.

References 

History of Guinea
Portuguese Cape Verde
Chartered companies
Defunct companies of Portugal
1675 establishments
Companies established in the 17th century